The Honor 10 is a smartphone made by Huawei under their Honor sub-brand.

The phone was released in April 2018, outside China in May 2018, and succeeded by the Honor 20 in June 2019. It uses the Kirin 970 SoC and is equipped with a 5.84" 2280x1080 LCD display.

It was available in a version with 4 GB memory and 64 GB of storage capacity, and a 'Premium edition' offering 6 GB of memory and double the amount of storage. In July, Honor launched the Honor 10 GT, further upgrading the model to 8 GB of memory and offering improved GPU performance and camera software. In June 2021, Huawei announced that the Honor 10 line would be eligible for installing HarmonyOS.

It was noted for being one of the first phones on the market featuring an ultrasonic fingerprint reader, as opposed to the conventional capacitive type.

Reception 
The phone was praised for being good value for money, offering a good build and screen quality, decent performance and camera quality, but reviewers criticized the phone for lacking wireless charging and water resistance.

References 

Mobile phones introduced in 2018
Android (operating system) devices
Huawei Honor
Mobile phones with multiple rear cameras